The Black Six is a 1974 American blaxploitation and outlaw biker film written by George Theakos and directed by Matt Cimber.  It starred several National Football League stars in the title roles. It was one of the first all-black biker films.

Plot

The plot involves an African American veteran of the Vietnam War, played by Gene Washington, who returns home to find that his brother (played by Robert Howard) has been killed. The killing was done by a white supremacist motorcycle gang, led by Ben "Thor" Davidson, who objected to the fact that Howard had been dating Thor's sister. Washington and his motorcycle gang, known as the Black Six, vow to avenge his brother's death. The Six encounter a number of obstacles, including hostile motorcycle gangs (particularly Thor's), and racist policemen.  The movie climaxes with an inconclusive battle royal between the Six and Thor's Caucasian-supremacist biker gang, in which Thor (apparently) blows them and himself up by igniting the gas tank of his own motorcycle. The film concludes with the caption Honky, look out...Hassle a brother, and the Black 6 will return!.

Cast
The titular "Black Six" was played by six then-current National Football League stars:

 Gene Washington, a wide receiver with the San Francisco 49ers
 Joe "Mean Joe" Greene, a defensive tackle with the Pittsburgh Steelers
 Eugene "Mercury" Morris, a running back with the Miami Dolphins
 Lemuel "Lem" Barney, a cornerback with the Detroit Lions
 Willie Lanier, a linebacker with the Kansas City Chiefs
 Carl Eller, a defensive end with the Minnesota Vikings

The players' teams appeared with the actors' names in the film's credits. In addition, the cast includes Ben Davidson, who had recently retired from football, as a member of a motorcycle gang opposing the Black Six.  Maury Wills, a recently retired Major League Baseball star, also has a role in the film.

Washington was given the lead role due to him having previous acting experience; he and several other cast members (many of whom did more acting afterwards) later criticized how poorly the script had been written. All six protagonists (and Davidson) were All-Pro, while Greene, Barney, Lanier and Eller have since been inducted into the Pro Football Hall of Fame.

Production

Filmed on location in Frazier Park, CA. Several of the football players were disappointed with elements in the original script, especially that the black motorcyclists would be killed in the end, despite the fact that they stood for truth, justice and the American way.  As a result of their protests, an inconclusive ending was shot.

DVD

The Black Six was released on DVD on October 12, 2004.

See also
 List of American films of 1974

References

External links 
 

1974 films
Blaxploitation films
Outlaw biker films
Films directed by Matt Cimber
American action thriller films
1970s action thriller films
American films about revenge
American vigilante films
American exploitation films
1970s English-language films
1970s American films